Tizdang may refer to:
 Tizdang-e Olya